"Vårvise" (in English: "Springsong") is a 1987 song by Danish singer-songwriter Sebastian and Norwegian singer Sissel Kyrkjebø. It is written by Sebastian and released as a single from his 16th album, På Vulkaner (1987), and the Danish version of Sissel's debut album, Sissel (1986). They performed it on the Danish TV-show Under Uret, hosted by Hans Otto Bisgaard. It was also Sissel's debut on Danish Television, and made her a familiar name in Denmark. The single peaked at number 13 there, on July 17, 1987. No music video was produced.

The B-side was "Summertime", which Sissel also performed on Under Uret.

Track listing
 7-inch single, Scandinavia (1987)   
"Vårvise" – 3:49
"Summertime" – 3:10

Charts

References

 

1987 singles
1987 songs
Sissel Kyrkjebø songs
Male–female vocal duets
Song articles with missing songwriters